A European Documentation Centre (EDC) is a body designated by the European Commission to collect and disseminate publications of the European Union for the purposes of research and education. There are 400 such centers in all member states of the EU. The mandate of an EDC is to receive all official EU publications, documents, contracts and electronic databases then make them available to researchers, educators, students, and interested members of the general public. The centers are also legal depositories of Acquis communautaire (EU law). Although primarily academic in nature, anyone can visit an EDC to consult official EU publications.

History and organisation 
European Documentation Centres were founded in 1963 by the European Commission. They are predominantly located at universities, university libraries, affiliated academic institutions, and non-university research institutes, both public and private. EU policy is that at least one EDC should be located in each region of a European Union member state. Candidate states and other countries can also have a designated EDC, supported jointly with local university libraries and the European Commission. EDCs are distinct from European Information Centers (EIC), which are geared more to the general public and consumer affairs.

The official purpose of the centres is:
Assist Universities and Institutes in education and research
Contribute to the transparency of European decision-making
Promote active debate on European policy and European integration
Assist interested members of the public to learn about EU policies in more depth.

Function 
The European Documentation Centres collect documents and publications that they receive from the various official institutions of the European Union. They also provide training and advice on the organisation and use of electronic information generated by EU institutions. EDCs also provide direct support to the academic staff and employees at universities and institutions in their research and teaching on European integration process.

Official EU Publications:
 Proceedings of the European Commission
 Official Journal of the European Union
 European Union Contracts
 Rulings of the European Court
 Statistical publications of the Publishing Department (OPOCE)
 Legislative Observatory of European Parliaments
 Other official documents

Official EU Databases:
 CORDIS: The EU Research Information Service
 Curia: EU Jurisprudence
 EUR-Lex: EU legislation
 PreLex: Inter-institutional procedures
 Eurostat: European statistics
 SCADplus: Scadplus: EU Legislation
 Tenders Electronic Daily: EU contracts and procurement

See also 
 German National Library of Economics (ZBW)

References

External links
 EU Information Centres and Networks
 Searchable map of Documentation Centres
 CORDIS
 Curia 
 Eurostat
 EurLex
 PreLex
 Scadplus
 TED
 Europe Direct - Europäische Dokumentationszentren

Publications of the European Union establishments

Law libraries
Libraries established in 1963
1963 in Europe
European Union law